KSON may refer to:

 KSON (FM) a radio station (103.7 FM) licensed to serve San Diego, California currently holding the call sign.
 KWFN, a radio station (97.3 FM) licensed to serve San Diego, California, which held the call sign KSON or KSON-FM from 1975 to 2017
 KGB-FM, a radio station (101.5 FM) licensed to serve San Diego, California, which held the call sign KSON-FM from 1950 to 1958
 KNSN (AM), a radio station (1240 AM) licensed to serve San Diego, California, which held the call sign KSON from 1947 to 1996 and from 1997 to 2009
 kson, YouTuber and VTuber affiliated with VShojo